Hatsuo "Jerry" Fujikawa (Feb 18, 1912 — Apr 30, 1983) was an American stage, screen and television actor known most notably as the gardener in Roman Polanski's film Chinatown.

Personal life
Fujikawa was born on February 18, 1912, in Monterey County, California. During early publicity surrounding his career, he was said to be a native of Salinas. When he was younger, he adopted the western nickname Harlan, the name under which he was known when he, along with other Japanese-Americans on the west coast, were summarily detained in concentration camps following the Attack on Pearl Harbor and the subsequent issuance of Executive Order 9066 in February 1942. At the time, he was living in Los Angeles. Fujikawa was detained at Manzanar War Relocation Center.

He was first married to Emily Elizabeth. They had three children together: one daughter, Tirsa Meiko, twin boys (Gerald Matsuo and Eugene Takeo. Before he and his family were interned, Fujikawa listed his former occupations as a gardener, in agriculture, and as a salesman.

While interned at Manzanar, Fujikawa volunteered for the United States Army, joining as a messenger of Charlie Company in the 100th Infantry Battalion in June 1943. Fujikawa's family moved to Longmont, Colorado, and his young son Gerald was killed in an automobile accident in Denver on June 5. His wife and children had planned to meet him in Denver prior to his induction ceremony in Salt Lake City. During his service, Fujikawa was wounded on July 9, 1944 near Castellina, Italy. Although his service record contains no further entries until his discharge date (May 17, 1945), Fujikawa participated in operations in France later in 1944. Fujikawa's first marriage disintegrated soon after he returned from the war in Europe.

After the war, Fujikawa adopted the stage name Jerry and married Marion "Skeeter" Gates, a Broadway actress, in 1953. Together they had three children: Charles, Peter, and Cynthia. Fujikawa and Gates were married until his death in 1983.

Career
Fujikawa initially gained publicity for his stage roles: debuting as a villager in the original Broadway production of The Teahouse of the August Moon (1953). Other stage appearances included a role in Ted Pollack's Wedding in Japan (1957, off-Broadway), as the butler Toy in The Pleasure of His Company (1958), and as Father Ling in It's a Bird... It's a Plane... It's Superman (1966).

During the early part of his career, Fujikawa also appeared in the films Go For Broke! (1951) and The Journey (1959). At the time, he was known primarily as a character actor, wearing special effects makeup for varied television roles in The Twilight Zone, The Untouchables, Bachelor Father, and The Man from U.N.C.L.E. His career would go on to include numerous guest roles on other prominent television shows, including seven appearances on M*A*S*H and other appearances in Taxi and The Winds of War.

Fujikawa had a recurring role as Matsu, the uncle of the eponymous Mr. T[akahashi] played by Pat Morita in the short-lived Mr. T and Tina (1976).

Legacy
In 1991, Fujikawa's daughter Cynthia began researching her father's life, which led to her reuniting in 1993 with her half-sister Tirsa from Jerry's first marriage. The research eventually was developed into the solo play Old Man River, first workshopped in 1995. It debuted in 1997 at the New Victory Theater and was filmed in 1998, directed by Allan Holzman; based on his work, Holzman would later receive an American Cinema Editors Eddie Award in 2000 for Documentaries.

Filmography

References

External links
 
 
 Fujikawa family internee data files: Jerry (Hatsuo) Emily Gerald Tirsa

1912 births
1983 deaths
United States Army personnel of World War II
American military personnel of Japanese descent
American male actors of Japanese descent
20th-century American male actors
American male film actors
American male television actors
American film actors of Asian descent
Japanese-American internees
Male actors from California
People from Monterey County, California